Carusi may refer to:

 Carusu, child labourers in Sicilian sulfur mines
 4700 Carusi, a minor planet
 Nazzareno Carusi, Italian pianist

See also
 Caruso (disambiguation)